Brule River State Forest is a state forest located in Douglas County, Wisconsin, U.S.A. that encompasses the Bois Brule River for most of its length from its headwaters to Lake Superior. It was founded in 1907 and is the second oldest state park after Interstate.

The Cedar Island Lodge, or "the Summer White House," where multiple American presidents and generals have vacationed, is located here. The state forest is popular with canoeists, and cross-country skiers.

External links
Wisconsin Department of Natural Resources - Brule River State Forest

Protected areas of Douglas County, Wisconsin
Wisconsin state forests
Protected areas established in 1907
1907 establishments in Wisconsin